A bearskin is a tall fur cap, usually worn as part of a ceremonial military uniform.  Traditionally, the bearskin was the headgear of grenadiers, and remains in use by grenadier and guards regiments in various armies.

Bearskins should not be confused with other types of fur military headdresses, notably the smaller busby.

History

The cloth caps worn by the original grenadiers in European armies during the seventeenth century were frequently trimmed with fur. The earliest record of a bearskin cap being worn by soldiers in Europe was during the mid-17th century.

The practice fell into disuse until the second half of the eighteenth century, when grenadiers in the British, Spanish, and French armies began wearing high fur hats with cloth tops, and, sometimes, ornamental front plates. Imitating their Prussian counterparts, French grenadiers are described as wearing bearskins as early as 1761.  The purpose appears to have been to add to the apparent height and impressive appearance of these troops both on the parade ground and the battlefield.

During the nineteenth century, the expense of bearskin caps, and difficulty of maintaining them in good condition on active service led to this form of headdress becoming generally limited to guardsmen, bands, or other units having a ceremonial role.  The British Foot Guards and Royal Scots Greys did however wear bearskins in battle during the Crimean War, and on peacetime manoeuvres until the introduction of khaki service dress in 1902.

Immediately prior to the outbreak of World War I in 1914, bearskins were still worn by guard, ceremonial palace, or other units in the British, Belgian, Danish, Dutch, Imperial German, Russian, and Swedish armies.  The Italian Sardinian Grenadiers had discarded bearskins in the nineteenth century, but were to readopt them for limited ceremonial wear in modern times.

In 1970, the Corps of Gendarmerie of Vatican City retired the use of its bearskin, with the unit's ceremonial uniform being taken out of service in 1970, after Pope Paul VI demilitarised the gendarmerie and reorganized law enforcement under the Central Security Office (later reverting its name to the Corps of Gendarmerie in 2002). Before its retirement, the bearskin was worn by select members of the corps, and included a red plume.

Contemporary use
As of 2020, there were 14 countries whose militaries used bearskin as a part of their ceremonial uniforms. Italy and Sweden are the only two countries that use bearskins made out of synthetic materials instead of real fur.

Australia
Presently, the Pipes and Drums Band of the 3rd Battalion, Royal Australian Regiment is authorised to wear a bearskin cap as a part of its ceremonial dress.

Belgium

Two units in Belgium presently use the bearskin cap, the Belgian Royal Escort (since 1938), of the Belgian Federal Police; and the Regiment Carabiniers Prins Boudewijn – Grenadiers of the Belgian Armed Forces Land Component.

Until 1914, bearskins were worn in parade uniform by the 'Régiment des Grenadiers' of the Belgian Army.  Bearskins were used in peacetime manoeuvres until around 1900, the bearskins were left in barracks upon mobilisation in August 1914, and German troops occupying Brussels reportedly took many as souvenirs.  The Regiment of Grenadiers' modern successor, the Regiment Carabiniers Prins Boudewijn – Grenadiers has readopted this headdress for limited ceremonial purposes.

In addition to military units, the bearskin cap is also used by the Belgian Royal Escorts, a civilian police unit.  Accompanying the monarch of ceremonial occasions, the duties of the escort unit were previously held by the Gendarmerie, a paramilitary unit of the Belgian Armed Forces that was disbanded in 1992.  The present Royal Escort Unit wears the pre–1914 full dress uniform of the defunct Gendarmerie, including its bearskin cap.

Canada
The bearskin caps used by the Canadian Armed Forces are of black fur and include a coloured plume on the side of the bearskin and a gold-coloured chin strap.  The Canadian Forces Dress Instructions authorise the use of bearskins for all its foot guards and fusilier regiments. 

In addition to foot guards and fusiliers, two line infantry regiments are also authorised to wear a bearskin cap with their ceremonial full-dress uniform: the Royal 22e Régiment (R22eR) and the Royal Regiment of Canada (RRegtC).  Usage of the bearskin cap by the R22eR is attributed to its historical regimental alliance with the British Army's Royal Welch Fusiliers, while the use of bearskins by the RRegtC is attributed to the regiment's historical lineage from The Royal Grenadiers of the Canadian Militia.

Bearskins used by fusilier regiments and the R22eR have their unit's cap badge at the front of the bearskin, while those of foot guards and the RRegtC do not have cap badges.

The following is a list of regiments whose members are authorised to wear a bearskin cap with their full dress uniform, along with the colour used on the unit's plume:

The Royal 22e Régiment, scarlet plume
The Governor General's Foot Guards, scarlet plume
The Canadian Grenadier Guards, white plume
The Royal Regiment of Canada, scarlet over white plume
Les Fusiliers du St-Laurent, white plume
Les Fusiliers Mont-Royal, white plume
The Princess Louise Fusiliers, grey plume
Les Fusiliers de Sherbrooke, white plume

Additionally, the military band of a unit that is authorised to wear the bearskin cap is also allowed to wear it as a part of their ceremonial uniform.  These bands include The Band of The Royal Regiment of Canada, La Musique du Royal 22e Régiment, and the Governor General's Foot Guards Band.  In addition to these units, the drum major of the Royal Highland Fusiliers of Canada Band are also authorised to wear the bearskin.

Denmark

Bearskins were introduced to make guardsmen appear taller and more intimidating.  The headgear was first adopted by the guard in 1805. Bearskins remain in use as a part of the Royal Danish Army's Royal Life Guards' full dress uniform. The Royal Life Guards are foot guards whose duties includes providing the guard for the Danish monarchy.

Italy
Two units within the Italian Army's Granatieri di Sardegna Mechanised Brigade use the bearskin cap as a part of its ceremonial uniform, the 1st Granatieri di Sardegna Regiment, and the 8th Cavalry Regiment Lancieri di Montebello.  As opposed to real bearskin, the bearskin caps of both regiments uses artificial fur.

Kenya
Bearskins are used by members of the Kenya Army Band of the Kenya Defence Forces as a part of their ceremonial uniform.

Netherlands

One unit of the Royal Netherlands Army uses the bearskin cap as a part of its ceremonial uniform, the Grenadiers' and Rifles Guard Regiment.

Spain
One company of the 1st King's Immemorial Infantry Regiment, which during ceremonies, is authorised to wear grenadier uniforms of the Charles III period, uses bearskins.

Sri Lanka
Presently the military band of the Sri Lanka Artillery uses the bearskin cap as a part of its ceremonial uniform.

Sweden

Presently, the grenadier company of the Swedish Army's Life Guards wears a bearskin cap as a part of its ceremonial uniform.  The bearskin is made out of nylon as opposed to real bearskin. 

Usage of the bearskin by the Life Guards originates with its predecessor unit, Svea Life Guards.  The unit was eventually merged with the Swedish Life Guard Dragoons in 2000 to form the present Life Guards unit.  Usage of the bearskin with the Svea Life Guards dates back to 1823, when Alexander I of Russia presented Charles XIV of Sweden a bearskin cap as a gift to be used by the Svea Life Guards.

United Kingdom
In 1768, the long cloth caps worn by grenadiers were discontinued, and bearskin caps introduced. Following the Battle of Waterloo, all members of the newly named Grenadier Guards were permitted to wear the bearskin.  This privilege had previously been restricted to the grenadier company of the regiment.  In 1831, this distinction was extended to the other two regiments of foot guards (Coldstream and Scots) in existence at that date.  Bearskins were subsequently adopted by the Irish Guards and the Welsh Guards when raised in 1900 and 1915 respectively.  Members of the following units are currently authorised to wear the bearskin cap with their full dress:

Grenadier Guards
Coldstream Guards
Scots Guards
Irish Guards
Welsh Guards
Royal Scots Dragoon Guards
Honourable Artillery Company

Along with these units, officers of fusilier regiments are also authorised to wear the bearskin as part of their ceremonial uniform.  Additionally the members of the regimental bands for the five regiments of foot guards, the Honourable Artillery Company, and the Royal Scots Dragoon Guards are also authorised to wear the headdress.  The drum major of the band for the Royal Highland Fusiliers is also authorised to wear the bearskin.

However, an officer's bearskin is made from the fur of the Canadian brown bear, as the female brown bear has thicker, fuller fur; officers' caps are dyed black. An entire skin is used for each head-dress. The British Army purchase the head-dresses, which are known as caps, from a British hatmaker which sources its pelts from an international auction. The hatmakers purchase between 50 and 100 black bear skins each year at a cost of about £650 each. If properly maintained, the caps last for decades.

Opposition
On 3 August 1888, The New York Times reported that bearskin caps might be phased out because of a shortage of bear skins.  The article stated that, at that time, bearskin hats cost £7–5s each (about 35 contemporary US dollars; £600 in 2007 pounds) and noted "it can readily be seen what a price has to be paid for keeping up a custom which is rather old, it is true, but is practically a useless one save for the purpose of military display."

In 1997, Minister for Defence Procurement Lord Gilbert said that he wanted to see bearskins phased out as soon as possible due to ethical concerns, but no replacement was available at that time.

In 2005, the Ministry of Defence began a two-year test of artificial fur for the hats.  The army has already replaced beaverskin caps and leopard skins, worn by some of its soldiers, with artificial materials.  In March 2005, Labour MP Chris Mullin called for an immediate ban on bearskins stating that they "have no military significance and involve unnecessary cruelty."

Animal rights group People for the Ethical Treatment of Animals (PETA) has protested against the continued use of real fur for the guards’ bearskin caps, alleging that the animals are killed cruelly.  For several years, PETA members have held demonstrations, including one at St Peter's Hill, near St Paul's Cathedral, in 2006.  PETA wants the fur caps to be replaced with synthetic materials, and claims that the Ministry of Defence has not done enough to find alternatives.  In February 2011, Joss Stone appeared in a PETA advert targeting the Ministry of Defence, showing the 23-year-old soul singer holding a teddy bear that covers her naked body, and features the slogan 'Bear Hugs, Not Bear Caps'.

United States

Presently one military unit in the United States uses a bearskin cap as a part of their ceremonial uniform, the Second Company Governor's Foot Guard of the Connecticut State Guard, a state defence force.  

In addition to the Governor's Guard, bearskin caps are also worn by the drum majors of various United States Armed Forces military bands.  Bands whose drum majors are authorised to wear the bearskin cap include the United States Air Force Band, the United States Army Band, United States Army Field Band, United States Coast Guard Band, United States Marine Band, the United States Navy Band, bands of the service academies, and a variety of other divisional and fleet bands.

In addition to military units, a number of civilian marching bands also adorn their drum majors with these headpieces as opposed to their synthetic counterparts.  University marching bands which were established through military means typically follow this style of dress for their drum majors.  There are also several secondary school bands that use real bearskin hats.

Uruguay
The Uruguayan Army's Company of Sappers of 1837 uses the bearskin cap as a part of its ceremonial uniform as the guard of honour company of the Uruguayan Supreme Court.

Similar headgear

Other furred caps
A busby is a military headdress made of fur that appears similar to a bearskin cap. Busbies are used by a variety of hussar and artillery units. Busbies are used by hussar regiments of the Royal Netherlands Army. Busbies are also used as the full-dress headgear for the British Army's Royal Horse Artillery and hussar regiments. Similarly, the Canadian Army uses the busby as its full-dress headgear for artillery, hussar and rifle regiments. In addition to hussar and artillery regiments, the First Company of the First Company Governor's Foot Guard of the Connecticut State Militia also include a bearskin (known as a "busby") as a part of their ceremonial uniform.

A sealskin cap is another furred cap similar to the bearskin cap, that is worn by the British Army's Royal Fusiliers.

Pith helmet

A number of units within the King's Guard of the Royal Thai Armed Forces wear a pith helmet with heavy plumes, making it broadly resemble a bearskin cap.  The pith helmets are used with the unit's ceremonial full dress uniform, for occasions including the Thai Royal Guards parade held every year in December, royal coronations, funerals, and anniversaries.  The colours of the plumes vary from black to pink and blue, depending on the units of the wearers, similar to the uniform facings in the Commonwealth.  The majority of the units entitled to wear these headdresses are from the Army and Air Force, with two Royal Thai Marine Corps battalions also maintaining this privilege.  In addition, the Royal Security Command's two guards regiments wear the pith helmet with black plums in their full dress.

See also
Feather bonnet
Shaguma

Notes

References

External links

Hats
Military uniforms
History of clothing (Western fashion)
Fur
History of fashion
Guards Division (United Kingdom)
Military hats